Major General John Rowlstone Stevenson,  (7 October 1908 – 4 July 1971) was an Australian Army officer and a parliamentary officer.

Stevenson was born in Bondi, Sydney, on 7 October 1908. He was the son of John James Stevenson, who was born in the United States, and Caroline Maude née Rowlstone, from Sydney. He went to Canterbury Boys' Intermediate School, then took an office job. He also played hockey and drove racing cars at the Maroubra speedway.

He rose to the rank of major general in the Australian Army, serving in both the 11th Australian Infantry Brigade and the 2/3rd Australian Infantry Battalion in the Second World War. He died on 4 July 1971, in Fiji. He is known for accepting Nauru as Australian territory.

References

1908 births
1971 deaths
Military personnel from New South Wales
Australian generals
Australian Army personnel of World War II
Commanders of the Order of Orange-Nassau
Commanders of the Order of the British Empire
Companions of the Distinguished Service Order
Legislative clerks
People educated at Canterbury Boys' High School
People from the Eastern Suburbs (Sydney)